, also known as Harp of Burma, is a children's novel by Michio Takeyama. It was first published in 1946 and was the basis of two films by Kon Ichikawa – one released in 1956 and a color remake in 1985. Both films were major successes. A translation of the novel into English by Howard Hibbett was published in 1966 by Charles E. Tuttle Company in cooperation with UNESCO.

Plot
Takeyama wrote the story wanting to give young readers hope after defeat in WWII by emphasizing the traditional Buddhist ideal of altruism, embodied in a soldier hero, Mizushima. Captured by the British led Indian forces, following the Surrender of Japan in July 1945, Mizushima is a harp-playing Japanese P.O.W. who volunteers to persuade a resisting Japanese unit to surrender. His attempt fails and in the ensuing battle he is left behind, assumed dead. Mizushima takes the clothes of a Buddhist monk, but then reappears as the monk to his former comrades. His comrades, led by Captain Inouye, gift the monk a blue parakeet trained to say "Mizushima come home", but Mizushima elects to stay behind in Burma to bury the dead. The title of the book comes from the saung, the musical instrument adopted by the soldier. The novel is more open than the 1956 film about Japan's responsibility for the war. In Takeyama's novel one of the soldiers talks of the "terrible trouble" which Japan has brought to Burma, and the hero soldier-become monk Mizushima criticizes Japan's colonial ambitions as "wasteful desires" and the Japanese having "forgotten the most important things in life", a perspective which is downplayed in the film.

Adaptations
There are two film adaptations and an animated television version (all with the same title as the novel in Japanese):
 The Burmese Harp (1956), a black-and-white Japanese film by Kon Ichikawa – a critical success nominated for the Academy Award for Best Foreign Language Film of 1956
 The Burmese Harp (1985), a color Japanese film, also by Kon Ichikawa – the number one Japanese film on the domestic market in 1985 and the second largest Japanese box office hit up to that time
 The Harp of Burma (1986), a Japanese animated television adaptation by Nippon Animation Co.

References

Japanese novels adapted into films
Central Park Media
Novels set during World War II
1946 novels
Burma in World War II
Tuttle Publishing books